Coralie Demay (born 10 October 1992) is a French professional racing cyclist, who currently rides for UCI Women's Continental Team .

Major results
2016
 Fenioux France Trophy
1st Points race
1st Scratch

2018
 1st Overall Rás na mBan – Tour of Ireland

See also
 List of 2016 UCI Women's Teams and riders

References

External links
 

1992 births
Living people
French female cyclists
People from Nogent-sur-Marne
Cyclists at the 2020 Summer Olympics
Olympic cyclists of France
Sportspeople from Val-de-Marne
Cyclists from Île-de-France
21st-century French women